Sands Point Seaplane Base  is a seaplane landing area in Manhasset Bay, two miles (3 km) northwest of Port Washington, in Nassau County, New York. During 1939-40 Sands Point was the New York base of Pan American's transatlantic Boeing 314 flights.

References

External links 
Brewer Capri Marina

Airports in Nassau County, New York
Seaplane bases in the United States